Chai Jing (born on January 1, 1976) is a Chinese journalist, former television host, author and environmental activist.

In 1995, Chai began her broadcast career as a radio host in Hunan Province. From 2001 to 2013, she worked for China Central Television (CCTV) as a well respected investigative reporter and host. In 2012 she published an autobiography, Insight, which sold more than 1 million copies.

In 2014, Chai undertook an independent investigation into China's environmental problems, which culminated in a self-financed documentary called Under the Dome. By March 3, 2015, the film had garnered over 150 million views in China, sparking widespread discussion about pollution and environmental policy in China. The film was blocked on Chinese websites by the authorities on March 7, 2015. In 2015 she was also named one of Time magazine's 100 most influential people.

Early life
Chai was born in Linfen, Shanxi, China. In 1991, she enrolled in Changsha Railway Institute (now known as Central South University or Zhongnan University Railway Campus) in Changsha, Hunan Province, majoring in accounting. While still a student, she wrote a letter to a host at a Hunan Arts Radio, asking: "Could you help me fulfill my dream?" The host offered her an interview and she was later hired to work at the station. After graduation in 1995, she hosted the radio program, Gentle Moonlight. Three years later, at age 22, she enrolled in Beijing Broadcasting Institute (now known as Communication University of China) to study television production, while hosting another Hunan radio program, New Youth,. In 2001, she joined China Central Television (CCTV) as a reporter and presenter, at the same time working on a Master of Fine Arts at Peking University.

Career at CCTV
In 2001, Chai became a host and reporter for Horizon Connection at CCTV. Two years later, as an investigative reporter, she covered the severe acute respiratory syndrome (SARS) crisis, appearing on camera in white protective clothing and looking pale and thin herself.

After the 2008 Sichuan earthquake in Wenchuan County, Chai went on scene to live with the refugees to experience their severe living conditions. She later compiled the experiences into a program called Seven Days at Yangping. The report raised her reputation as a television reporter.

In 2009, Chai left investigative reporting to anchor 24 Hours and host One on One for CCTV News. In 2011, she became one of the hosts of the weekend edition of Insight.

Chai is known for her direct, get-to-the point interview technique.

Some controversy arose surrounding Chai in 2013. After marrying famous photographer Zhao Jia she became pregnant, but she chose not to deliver her child in a hospital in China. Instead, she traveled to the United States before it was time for her to give birth.

Fabricated corruption allegations
On September 19, 2009, a blogger, Wujinger1, posted a false article, "Famous CCTV hostess Chai Jing arrested today on suspicion of taking bribes". The next day, Chai herself blogged a denial of the rumor. Several months later, on July 13, 2010, Wujinger1 ran another false article, "CCTV hostess Chai Jing was taken away by the procuratorate again today", alleging that she was again being investigated on corruption charges. It was later discovered that Wujinger1 was Wu Zhibo, who wanted to seek attention. He apologized to Chai, saying she was his idol, and he wanted the public to know more about Chai.

Under the Dome environmental documentary

While still pregnant, Chai was told her daughter had a benign tumor. Some rumour says her daughter's tumor may be caused by her smoking during pregnancy, meanwhile some of her friends denied she has the smoking habit. Following her daughter's birth, Chai undertook her own year-long investigation into China's environmental problems, spending nearly 1 million yuan ($167,000) producing a documentary called Under the Dome, which was released for free online viewing on March 1, 2015. The documentary, with Chai as a matter-of-fact on-stage presenter, was viewed more than 150 million times by March 3 and has since been censored in China.

Programs
 One on One (面对面) is a 45-minute personal interview and biographical show of celebrities, current events and authority figures.
 Insight, which began in 2010, was hosted by Chai on weekends. The multimedia program observes life changes and people's desires, thoughts and perceptions in the rapid transformation of the time. The goal is to improve understanding among people.

Publications
 Chai Jing. (2001). Use My Lifetime To Forget autobiography.. Hainan Publishing House.
 Chai Jing. (2013). Kanjian or Insight autobiography.. Guangxi Normal University Press.

Awards
 2003: Correspondent of the Year for investigative journalism on the fight against SARS
 2008: Annual Green Characters Moving China in 2007
 2009: Capital Association of Female Reporters speech contest award
 2010: Golden Camera Prize of the Potatoes Festival. She was chosen as one of the Annual Top Ten Hosts of CCTV

See also
Pollution in China

References

External links
 Chai Jing's weibo
 Chai Jing's blog
 Under the Dome on Youku
 "Under the Dome" on YouTube, including full English subtitles

1976 births
Living people
Chinese activists
Chinese women activists
Chinese environmentalists
Chinese women environmentalists
Chinese television presenters
People from Linfen
Chinese documentary filmmakers
Women documentary filmmakers
Writers from Shanxi
21st-century Chinese women writers
21st-century Chinese writers
Chinese women television presenters